Black Field is a 2009 Canadian historical drama film and the debut of filmmaker Danishka Esterhazy. It is set in the 1870s and tells the story of a love triangle between a man and two sisters Maggie (Sara Canning) and Rose McGregor (Ferron Guerreiro).

Premise
Black Field is an historical drama set in the 1870s that tells of a love triangle about two British sisters Maggie (Sara Canning) and Rose McGregor (Ferron Guerreiro) and the man that comes between them.

Cast

Production
Black Field began principal filming on April 27, 2009 in Manitoba with development support from Canada's Super Channel.

Reception
Of its filming, Aaron Graham of Uptown wrote "writer/director Danishka Esterhazy's feature-length debut, Black Field, is shaping up to be a striking period piece".  Reel West magazine gave the cover spot and presented a featured article on Black Field.  After its premiere at the Vancouver International Film Festival, Marina Antunes of Row Three wrote "The film is notable for both its visuals and Canning's performance but also for its score..'" and summarized "Black Field is a gorgeous film which delivers a remarkable story of survival".

References

External links
 

2009 films
2000s historical drama films
English-language Canadian films
Films set in the 1870s
Films shot in Manitoba
Canadian historical drama films
2009 drama films
2000s English-language films
2000s Canadian films